This is a list of awards and nominations received by South Korean girl group Oh My Girl.


Awards and nominations

Other accolades

State and cultural honors

Notes

References 

Oh My Girl
Awards